Till Death is a 2021 American thriller film directed by S.K. Dale in his directorial debut, from a screenplay by Jason Carvey. It stars Megan Fox, Callan Mulvey, Eoin Macken, Aml Ameen, and Jack Roth.

Till Death was released in the United States by Screen Media Films in a limited number of theaters on July 2, 2021, and was simultaneously released on video on demand. The film received generally favorable reviews, with highlights to Fox's performance and Dale's direction.

Plot
Emma is unhappily married to her cold, controlling husband Mark, who works as a criminal attorney. After ending her affair with Tom, a partner at her husband's firm, Emma goes out with Mark to celebrate their anniversary. Mark surprises Emma with a necklace made of steel, then drives her to a secluded lake house that they used to visit early in their relationship. That evening, Mark apologizes for his past behavior and they make love.

The next morning, Emma wakes to find herself handcuffed to Mark, who abruptly commits suicide by shooting himself in the head. Forced to drag his corpse everywhere she goes, Emma discovers that Mark destroyed her phone and removed every sharp item from the house. She eventually finds the keys to their SUV and reaches the garage. When she starts the vehicle, the radio plays a taunting message from Mark, revealing he knew of her affair with Tom. The SUV then dies due to the gas having been siphoned out by Mark the night before.
 
Hours later, Tom arrives at the lake house. He tells Emma that he was summoned by texts from her phone and that Mark was facing disbarment for illegal activities at his practice. They both realize that Mark sent the messages to lure Tom just as a mysterious truck is seen approaching the house. Emma hides while Tom greets a man named Jimmy from the truck. Jimmy says he's there to fix the plumbing and refuses to leave despite Tom's attempts to disuade him. Jimmy's brother, Bobby, then gets out of the truck and stabs Tom to death. It's revealed Bobby was a stalker who once attacked Emma and just got out of prison after serving 10 years.

Emma manages to evade the men and makes it to the boat shed. She uses an anchor to cut herself free from Mark's corpse and hides just as the men enter the shed. Emma overhears them revealing Mark hired them to kill her and that they must find the diamonds they were promised. Bobby suspects the diamonds are in the bedroom safe, which requires Mark's fingerprints and a code that Emma would know.

As the men search the house, Emma finds a fuel can and tries refueling the SUV, but Bobby slashed the tires. Emma then makes her way to the attic and lures the men there. She knocks Bobby out with a club and locks Jimmy in a nearby room. She attempts to escape in Tom's car, but Bobby intervenes. Emma manages to dial 911 on Tom's phone prior to being knocked unconscious. She later wakes up in the bedroom, once again cuffed to Mark's body.

Bobby tells Emma the safe's code is the date Mark proposed to her. When she refuses to cooperate, Bobby threatens to torture her. Jimmy objects and points Mark's gun at Bobby. Emma agrees to reveal the code if she is set free first. Emma is uncuffed and she tells them the code. Bobby opens the safe, only to find a hacksaw inscribed with a clue that implies the diamonds are in Emma's necklace, which has no latch and is impossible to remove. Bobby realizes the necklace can only be retrieved by decapitating Emma. Jimmy tries wrestling the saw away from Bobby, but is accidentally impaled on a coat hook, killing him. Enraged, Bobby attacks Emma, stabbing her in the leg. She manages to fight him off and cuff Bobby to Mark's body.

Emma makes it to the SUV again as Bobby pursues, dragging Mark with him. She hits Bobby with the car but then crashes into the boat shed. Emma exits the car and fights Bobby on the frozen lake. She stabs Bobby in the shoulder just as the ice gives way. Mark's corpse falls into the lake, dragging Bobby with him. Bobby manages to grab Emma and pull her in as well. As they sink, Emma grabs the knife out of Bobby's shoulder and stabs him in the eye. Mark's body drags Bobby down to his death as Emma swims up to the surface. Lying atop the ice, Emma removes her wedding ring and lets it roll into the lake as sirens are heard approaching in the background.

Cast
 Megan Fox as Emma
 Eoin Macken as Mark 
 Callan Mulvey as Bobby Ray
 Jack Roth as Jimmy
 Aml Ameen as Tom

Production
In February 2020, it was announced Megan Fox had joined the cast of the film, with S.K. Dale directing from a screenplay by Jason Carvey. In August 2020, Callan Mulvey, Eoin Macken, Aml Ameen and Jack Roth joined the cast of the film.

Principal photography began in August 2020, in Sofia, Bulgaria. Production was previously set to begin in March 2020, but was delayed due to the COVID-19 pandemic. Over the course of 4–5 weeks, Megan Fox dragged a Bulgarian stunt man across the floor in every scene, and due to the time difference between the US and Bulgaria, only slept 2–3 hours a day.

Release
In May 2021, Screen Media Films acquired distribution rights to the film. Till Death was released in the United States in a limited amount of theaters on July 2, 2021, and was simultaneously released on video on demand.

According to data reported to PostVOD (by Screen Engine) that was released in early July 2021, Till Death was singled out as one of the low-budget movies most likely to be watched by audiences on VOD, coming in second.

Jacob Oller of Paste Magazine listed the movie's trailer as one of the best of the week in June 2021.

Reception
Till Death holds a 90% approval rating on review aggregator website Rotten Tomatoes, based on 39 reviews, with a weighted average of 6.70/10. The critics consensus reads "Elevated by S.K. Dale's inventive direction and Megan Fox's committed performance, Till Death will part the viewer with all but the edge of their seat." On Metacritic, the film holds a rating of 66 out of 100, based on 5 critics, indicating "generally favorable reviews".

Writing for The New York Times, Beatrice Loayza said that "this straightforward romp focuses its attention on its cunning and no-nonsense scream queen. And what Fox lacks in dramatic prowess, she makes up for in pure, wicked magnetism." In his review for Variety, Manuel Betancourt said that, "Even as the twists and turns get ever more preposterous ... Dale’s direction and Fox’s commitment go a long way toward making Till Death a glossy, entertaining lark." Waldemar Dalenogare Neto declared that the film works because of Megan Fox and said he hoped that because of the "positive repercussions she would look for better roles ... [this] is an interesting film for those who like thriller".

Fox's performance was singled out positively by online critics including Scott Weinberg (Thrillist), who admired the "very strong lead performance from Megan Fox"; Julian Roman (MovieWeb), who said she "delivers her career best performance"; Chad Collins (Dread Central), who said, "Megan Fox is always a welcome horror star, a contemporary scream queen with more grit and grunge than most, and she's as good here as she's ever been"; Lee McCoy (DrumDums), said, "It's a welcome return to horror for Megan Fox after 11 years since the cult classic Jennifer's Body.

In a review for Common Sense Media, Jeffrey M. Anderson said that "after a shaky start, this taut, vicious horror/thriller crackles to life with a dark sense of logic, a harrowing depiction of mental and emotional abuse, and a woman's boundless strength ... it ultimately makes more sense than any Saw-related deathtraps." The previously mentioned MovieWeb review called SK Dale's debut "brilliant" and said, "He nails the Hitchcockian aspects of the narrative." Tomris Laffly, of RogerEbert.com, called the film "undemanding, a little silly, but a thoroughly engrossing and handsomely paced edge-of-your-seat experience all the same."

References

External links
 
 

2021 films
2021 horror thriller films
2021 action thriller films
American horror thriller films
American action horror films
2021 directorial debut films
Films shot in Bulgaria
Films postponed due to the COVID-19 pandemic
Film productions suspended due to the COVID-19 pandemic
2020s English-language films
2020s American films